Shopping City may refer to:

Runcorn Shopping City, a shopping centre in Cheshire, England
The Mall Wood Green, a shopping centre in north London, England
Salford Shopping Centre, formerly Salford Shopping City
Shopping City (television programme), a British consumer survey television programme